The O'Grady family, also styled O'Grady of Kilballyowen, is one of Ireland's noble families and surviving Chiefs of the Name. Their title is The O'Grady in English and Ó Gráda in Irish.

Naming conventions

History
They belong to the Dál gCais kindred and are distant cousins to the O'Brien dynasty, but have since the Middle Ages been based not in County Clare, from where they originated, but in County Limerick. The seat of the family, Kilballyowen, is near the town of Bruff.

The name Standish was often used by the family; it derives from the marriage in 1633 of Darby O'Grady, The O'Grady, to Faith Standish. 

Some of the O'Grady family converted to the Church of Ireland (Anglican Communion) and produced a Bishop of Meath, Hugh Brady. The family also produced some prominent historians such as Standish Hayes O'Grady and Standish James O'Grady. 

The now extinct title in the peerage of Ireland, the Viscount Guillamore, was held by the family.

See also
 List of people with surname O'Grady

References

 Burke, Bernard and Hugh Montgomery-Massingberd, Burke's Irish Family Records. London: Burke's Peerage Ltd. 5th edition, 1976.
 Curley, Walter J.P., Vanishing Kingdoms: The Irish Chiefs and their Families. Dublin: Lilliput Press. 2004.
 O'Hart, John, Irish Pedigrees. Dublin: James Duffy and Co. 5th edition, 1892.
 Rough notes from the Araltas website

External links
Hy-Donghaile from Ordnance Survey Letters by John O'Donovan and Eugene Curry, 1839

 
Septs of the Dál gCais